Taj Bengal is an Indian luxury hotel in Kolkata, operated by the Taj Hotels and designed by American architect Bob Fox. The hotel was inaugurated on 10 October 1989 by Jyoti Basu, who was then the Chief Minister of West Bengal.

The hotel has 200 rooms and 29 suites, with terracotta statuary and palm-covered atrium lobby. It has fine dining restaurants such as Cal27, Sonargaon, Souk, Chinoiseire and The Chambers, along with an al fresco area and banquet halls.

Taj Bengal was the only Taj Hotels property in the state of West Bengal until Taj Gateway Hotel was opened in 2013.

References

External links

 

Hotels in Kolkata
Taj Hotels Resorts and Palaces
Hotels established in 1989
Hotel buildings completed in 1989
1989 establishments in West Bengal
20th-century architecture in India